Lacinutrix cladophorae is a Gram-negative, strictly aerobic, rod-shaped and motile bacterium from the genus of Lacinutrix which has been isolated from the alga Cladophora stimpsonii.

References 

Flavobacteria
Bacteria described in 2016